Football Against the Enemy is a book by Simon Kuper. It won the 1994 William Hill Sports Book of the Year award. In the United States, it was released as Soccer Against the Enemy.

In fiction
In Ted Lasso Season 2, Episode 6 "The Signal" Coach Beard is shown reading the book.

References

Association football books